Everett E. Bolle (1919-1987) was a member of the Wisconsin State Assembly.

Biography
Bolle was born August 29, 1919 in Kossuth, Wisconsin. After graduating from high school in Two Rivers, Wisconsin, Bolle took part in the University of Wisconsin-Extension program. He was a member of the Society of the Holy Name and the Knights of Columbus. He died on September 7, 1987.

Career
Bolle was first elected to the Assembly in 1960. He was defeated for re-election in 1974 by Alan Lasee. Additionally, Bolle was Supervisor of Francis Creek, Wisconsin. He was a Democrat.

References

People from Kossuth, Wisconsin
Democratic Party members of the Wisconsin State Assembly
1919 births
1987 deaths
20th-century American politicians
People from Manitowoc County, Wisconsin